Vinoba Bhave Institute of Medical Sciences / NAMO Medical Education & Research Institute  (also known as Government Medical College, Silvassa) is a government medical college located in Silvassa in the Union Territory of Dadra and Nagar Haveli and Daman and Diu. The union government allocated the fund of 189 crore for its construction. The foundation stone was laid by the Prime Minister of India Shri Narendra Modi on 19 January 2019, and the first undergraduate batch commenced on 15 August 2019. 

The medical college is attached to Shrri Vinoba Bhave Civil Hospital, Silvassa. It is expected to meet the growing demand of doctors in the region. The college is affiliated to Veer Narmad South Gujarat University and imparts the Bachelor of Medicine and Bachelor of Surgery (MBBS) degree which is recognized by National Medical Council of India formerly known as Medical Council of India (MCI). The selection of the college is done purely on the basis of merit through National Eligibility and Entrance Test. The yearly undergraduate student intake is 180.

Courses
Shri Vinoba Bhave Institute of Medical Sciences undertakes education and training of students for MBBS course. This college offers 177 MBBS seats of which 85% Seats are filled through State quota and 15% through All-India quota.

References

External links 
 http://vbch.dnh.nic.in/

2019 establishments in Dadra and Nagar Haveli
Educational institutions established in 2019
Medical colleges in Dadra and Nagar Haveli
Universities and colleges in Dadra and Nagar Haveli and Daman and Diu
Silvassa